The Chicken Historic District encompasses part of the historic mining district of Chicken, Alaska. It is located at milepost 66.5 on the north side of the Taylor Highway, and includes fifteen buildings built between 1908 and 1967. Most of these are single-story wood-frame structures, with either metal or board-and-batten siding, although there are also some log structures. Many of these buildings were erected by the Fairbanks Exploration Company, which ran the gold mining operations in the area. Notable buildings include the bunkhouse, a gabled log structure, and the Chicken Creek Roadhouse, built in 1906, which was originally two stories in height but was reduced to a single story in 1924. The camp was used until the company ended mining operations in 1967.

The district was listed on the National Register of Historic Places in 2001.

See also
National Register of Historic Places listings in Southeast Fairbanks Census Area, Alaska

References

Buildings and structures completed in 1908
Gold mining in Alaska
Historic districts on the National Register of Historic Places in Alaska
National Register of Historic Places in Southeast Fairbanks Census Area, Alaska
1908 establishments in Alaska